This is a tentative list of butterflies found in Odisha, a state in India.

Family Lycaenidae
Common Pierrot (Castalius rosimon)
Rounded Pierrot (Tarucus extricatus) Butler, 1886

Family Nymphalidae
Tawny coaster (Acraea terpsicore) Linnaeus, 1758
Plain tiger (Danaus chrysippus) Linnaeus, 1758
White tiger (Danaus melanippus) Cramer, 1777
Common crow (Euploea core) Cramer, 1780
Peacock pansy (Junonia almana) Linnaeus, 1758
Yellow pansy (Junonia hierta)
Blue pansy (Junonia orithya) Linnaeus, 1758
Common leopard (Phalanta phalantha) Drury, 1773

Family Pieridae
Mottled emigrant (Catopsilia pyranthe) Linnaeus, 1758
White Arab (Colotis vestalis) Butler, 1876
Common grass yellow (Eurema hecabe) Linnaeus, 1758
Cabbage white (Pieris rapae) (Linnaeus, 1758)

Family Papilionidae
Crimson rose (Pachliopta hector) (Linnaeus, 1758)

See also
Butterfly
List of butterflies of India
Fauna of India
Flora of India

Odisha
Environment of Odisha
Butterflies
Odisha